Le Concorde is a Los Angeles-based synthpop musical project by singer, songwriter and multi-instrumentalist Stephen Becker, Ph.D.

Discography

Studio albums
 Le Concorde EP (2004)
 Universe and Villa (2005) March Records / What Are Records?
 Suite EP (2007) Le Grand Magistery
 House (2010) Le Grand Magistery

References
http://www.allmusic.com/album/house-r1955945/review
http://issuu.com/bayareareporter/docs/march_17_2011
http://www.popmatters.com/pm/post/134586-20-questions-le-concorde/
http://www.popmatters.com/pm/review/134926-le-concorde-house/
http://www.pandora.com/music/artist/le+concorde
http://www.seattlepi.com/default/article/I-Hear-Sparks-Le-Concorde-House-1021094.php

Electronic music groups from Illinois
Indie rock musical groups from Illinois
Musical groups from Chicago
Musical groups from Los Angeles